The History of Sexuality is a four-volume study of sexuality in the Western world by the French historian and philosopher Michel Foucault, in which the author examines the emergence of "sexuality" as a discursive object and separate sphere of life and argues that the notion that every individual has a sexuality is a relatively recent development in Western societies. The first volume, The Will to Knowledge (La volonté de savoir), was first published in 1976; an English translation appeared in 1978. The Use of Pleasure (L'usage des plaisirs), and The Care of the Self (Le souci de soi), were published in 1984. The fourth volume, Confessions of the Flesh (Les aveux de la chair), was published posthumously in 2018.

In Volume 1, Foucault criticizes the "repressive hypothesis": the idea that western society suppressed sexuality from the 17th to the mid-20th century due to the rise of capitalism and bourgeois society. Foucault argues that discourse on sexuality in fact proliferated during this period, during which experts began to examine sexuality in a scientific manner, encouraging people to confess their sexual feelings and actions. According to Foucault, in the 18th and 19th centuries society took an increasing interest in sexualities that did not fit within the marital bond: the "world of perversion" that includes the sexuality of children, the mentally ill, the criminal and the homosexual, while by the 19th century, sexuality was being readily explored both through confession and scientific enquiry. In Volume 2 and Volume 3, Foucault addresses the role of sex in Greek and Roman antiquity.

The book received a mixed reception, with some reviewers praising it and others criticizing Foucault's scholarship.

Volume I: The Will to Knowledge

Part I: We "Other Victorians"
In Part One, Foucault discusses the "repressive hypothesis", the widespread belief among late 20th-century westerners that sexuality, and the open discussion of sex, was socially repressed during the late 17th, 18th, 19th and early 20th centuries, a by-product of the rise of capitalism and bourgeois society, before the partial liberation of sexuality in modern times. Arguing that sexuality was never truly repressed, Foucault asks why modern westerners believe the hypothesis, noting that in portraying past sexuality as repressed, it provides a basis for the idea that in rejecting past moral systems, future sexuality can be free and uninhibited, a "...garden of earthly delights". The title of the section is inspired by Steven Marcus's book The Other Victorians: A Study of Sexuality and Pornography in Mid-Nineteenth-Century England.

Part II: The Repressive Hypothesis

In Part Two, Foucault notes that from the 17th century to the 1970s, there had actually been a "...veritable discursive explosion" in the discussion of sex, albeit using an "...authorized vocabulary" that codified where one could talk about it, when one could talk about it, and with whom. He argues that this desire to talk so enthusiastically about sex in the western world stems from the Counter-Reformation, when the Roman Catholic Church called for its followers to confess their sinful desires as well as their actions. As evidence for the obsession of talking about sex, he highlights the publication of the book My Secret Life, anonymously written in the late 19th century and detailing the sex life of a Victorian gentleman. Indeed, Foucault states that at the start of the 18th century, there was an emergence of "...a political, economic, and technical incitement to talk about sex,"...with self-appointed experts speaking both moralistically and rationally on sex, the latter sort trying to categorize it. He notes that in that century, governments became increasingly aware that they were not merely having to manage "subjects" or "a people" but a "population", and that because of this they had to concern themselves with such topics as birth and death rates, marriage, and contraception, thereby increasing their interest and changing their discourse on sexuality.

Foucault argues that prior to the 18th century, discourse on sexuality focuses on the productive role of the married couple, which is monitored by both canonical and civil law. In the 18th and 19th centuries, he argues, society ceases discussing the sex lives of married couples, instead taking an increasing interest in sexualities that did not fit within this union; the "world of perversion" that includes the sexuality of children, the mentally ill, the criminal and the homosexual. He notes that this had three major effects on society. Firstly, there was increasing categorization of these "perverts"; where previously a man who engaged in same-sex activities would be labeled as an individual who succumbed to the sin of sodomy, now they would be categorised into a new "species," that of homosexual. Secondly, Foucault argues that the labeling of perverts conveyed a sense of "pleasure and power" on to both those studying sexuality and the perverts themselves. Thirdly, he argues that bourgeois society exhibited "blatant and fragmented perversion," readily engaging in perversity but regulating where it could take place.

Part III: Scientia Sexualis
In part three, Foucault explores the development of the scientific study of sex, the attempt to unearth the "truth" of sex, a phenomenon which Foucault argues is peculiar to the West. In contrast to the West's sexual science, Foucault introduces the ars erotica, which he states has only existed in Ancient and Eastern societies. Furthermore, he argues that this scientia sexualis has repeatedly been used for political purposes, being utilized in the name of "public hygiene" to support state racism. Returning to the influence of the Catholic confession, he looks at the relationship between the one confessing and the authoritarian figure that he confesses to, arguing that as Roman Catholicism was eclipsed in much of Western and Northern Europe following the Reformation, the concept of confession survived and became more widespread, entering into the relationship between parent and child, patient and psychiatrist and student and educator. By the 19th century, he maintains, the "truth" of sexuality was being readily explored both through confession and scientific enquiry. Foucault proceeds to examine how the confession of sexuality then comes to be "constituted in scientific terms," arguing that scientists begin to trace the cause of all aspects of human psychology and society to sexual factors.

Part IV: The Deployment of Sexuality

In part four, Foucault explores the question as to why western society wishes to seek for the "truth" of sex. Foucault argues that we need to develop an "analytics" of power through which to understand sex. Highlighting that power controls sex by laying down rules for others to follow, he discusses how power demands obedience through domination, submission, and subjugation, and also how power masks its true intentions by disguising itself as beneficial. As an example, he highlights the manner in which the feudal absolute monarchies of historical Europe, themselves a form of power, disguised their intentions by claiming that they were necessary to maintain law, order, and peace. As a leftover concept from the days of feudalism, Foucault argues that westerners still view power as emanating from law, but he rejects this, proclaiming that we must "...construct an analytics of power that no longer takes law as a model and a code," and announcing that a different form of power governs sexuality. "We must," Foucault states, "at the same time conceive of sex without the law, and power without the king."

Foucault explains that he does not mean power as the domination or subjugation exerted on society by the government or the state. Rather, power should be understood "as the multiplicity of force relations immanent in the sphere in which they operate." In this way, he argues, "Power is everywhere . . . because it comes from everywhere," emanating from all social relationships and being imposed throughout society bottom-up rather than top-down. Foucault criticizes Wilhelm Reich, writing that while an important "historico-political" critique of sexual repression formed around Reich, "the very possibility of its success was tied to the fact that it always unfolded within the deployment of sexuality, and not outside or against it." According to Foucault, that sexual behavior in western societies was able to change in many ways "without any of the promises or political conditions predicted by Reich being realized" demonstrates that the "antirepressive" struggle is "a tactical shift and reversal in the great deployment of sexuality."

Part V: Right of Death and Power over Life
In part five, Foucault asserts that the motivations for power over life and death have changed. As in feudal times the "right to life" was more or less a "right to death" because sovereign powers were able to decide when a person died. This has changed to a "right to live," as sovereign states are more concerned about the power of how people live. Power becomes about how to foster life. For example, a state decides to execute someone as a safe guard to society not as justified, as it once was, as vengeful justice. This new emphasis on power over life is called Biopower and comes in two forms. First, Foucault says it is "centered on the body as a machine: its disciplining, the optimization of its capabilities, the extortion of its forces, the parallel increase of its usefulness and its docility, its integration into systems of efficient and economic controls." The second form, Foucault argues, emerged later and focuses on the "species body, the body imbued with the mechanics of life and serving as the basis of the biological processes: propagation, births and mortality, the level of health, life expectancy and longevity, with all the conditions that cause these to vary." Biopower, it is argued, is the source of the rise of capitalism, as states became interested in regulating and normalizing power over life and not as concerned about punishing and condemning actions.

Volume II: The Use of Pleasure
In this volume, Foucault discusses "the manner in which sexual activity was problematized by philosophers and doctors in classical Greek culture of the fourth century B. C.". Exploring works of Greek philosophers such as Seneca, Xenophon, Plato, and many more, Foucault explains the aim of this volume to unravel the process of the structuralization of sexuality as an ethical practice in Greek culture. To do so, the book inspects four Greek practices: dietetics to understand the relation of the self with the body, economics as the management of marriage and households, erotics to explore the codes of conduct between men and boys, and finally, the understanding of true love in philosophy. For Foucault, this exploration of Greek practices illustrates an "history of the desiring subject", which is crucial for understanding the modern construction of sexuality.

Volume III: The Care of the Self
In this volume, Foucault discusses texts such as the Oneirocritica, (The Interpretation of Dreams), of Artemidorus. Other authors whose work is discussed include Galen, Plutarch, and Pseudo-Lucian. Foucault describes the Oneirocritica as a "point of reference" for his work, one that exemplifies a common way of thinking.

Volume IV: Confessions of the Flesh

In this draft version of the fourth volume, published and translated after his death, Foucault traces the adoption and adaptation by early Christian societies of earlier pre-Christian ideas of pleasure. He discusses Saint Augustine of Hippo.

Publication history
Three volumes of The History of Sexuality were published before Foucault's death in 1984. The first volume, The Will to Knowledge (previously known as An Introduction in English—Histoire de la sexualité, 1: la volonté de savoir in French) was published in France in 1976, and translated in 1977, focusing primarily on the last two centuries, and the functioning of sexuality as an analytics of power related to the emergence of a science of sexuality, and the emergence of biopower in the West. The work was a further development of the account of the interaction of knowledge and power Foucault provided in Discipline and Punish (1975).

According to Arnold Davidson, the back cover of the first volume announced that there would be five forthcoming volumes: Volume 2, The Flesh and the Body, would "concern the prehistory of our modern experience of sexuality, concentrating on the problematization of sex in early Christianity"; Volume 3, The Children's Crusade, would discuss "the sexuality of children, especially the problem of childhood masturbation"; Volume 4, Woman, Mother, Hysteric, would discuss "the specific ways in which sexuality had been invested in the female body"; Volume 5, Perverts, was "planned to investigate exactly what the title named"; and Volume 6, Population and Races, was to examine "the way in which treatises, both theoretical and practical, on the topics of population and race were linked to the history" of "biopolitics." Foucault subsequently abandoned this plan.

The second two volumes, The Use of Pleasure (Histoire de la sexualité, II: l'usage des plaisirs) and The Care of the Self (Histoire de la sexualité, III: le souci de soi) dealt with the role of sex in Greek and Roman antiquity. The latter volume deals considerably with the ancient technological development of the hypomnema which was used to establish a permanent relationship to oneself. Both were published in 1984, the year of Foucault's death, the second volume being translated in 1985, and the third in 1986.

The fourth volume, Confessions of the Flesh was published posthumously in 2018 despite Foucault explicitly disallowing posthumous publication of his works, and was published in English for the first time by Penguin in Feb 2021, translated by Robert Hurley who had translated Penguin's earlier volumes in the series, and was released straight into their Penguin Classics imprint. The work first became available to researchers when both handwritten and typed manuscripts of Confessions of the Flesh were sold by Daniel Defert, Foucault's partner, to the National Library of France in 2013 as part of the Foucault archive. Foucault's family decided that as the material was already partially accessible, it should be published for everyone to read.

In his lecture series from 1979 to 1980 Foucault extended his analysis of government to its "...wider sense of techniques and procedures designed to direct the behaviour of men", which involved a new consideration of the "...examination of conscience" and confession in early Christian literature. These themes of early Christian literature seemed to dominate Foucault's work, alongside his study of Greek and Roman literature, until the end of his life. The planned fourth volume of The History of Sexuality was accordingly entitled Confessions of the Flesh (Les aveux de la chair), addressing Christianity. However, Foucault's death left the work incomplete, and the publication was delayed due to the restrictions of Foucault's estate. The volume was almost finished at the time of his death, and a copy was held in the Foucault archive. It was edited and finally published in February 2018.

Reception
The reception of The History of Sexuality among scholars and academics has been mixed.

Scientific and academic journals
The cultural anthropologist and sociologist Stephen O. Murray wrote in the Archives of Sexual Behavior that a passage of The History of Sexuality in which Foucault discussed how European medical discourse of the late 19th century had classified homosexuals had "clouded the minds" of many social historical theorists and researchers, who had produced a "voluminous discourse" that ignored how homosexuals had been classified before the late 19th century or non-European cultures. The philosopher Alan Soble wrote in the Journal of Sex Research that The History of Sexuality "caused a thunderstorm among philosophers, historians, and other theorists of sex". He credited Foucault with inspiring "genealogical" studies "informed by the heuristic idea that not only are patterns of sexual desire and behavior socially engineered ... but also that the concepts of our sexual discourse are equally socially constructed" and with influencing "gender studies, feminism, Queer Theory, and the debate about the resemblance and continuity, or lack of it, between ancient and contemporary homoeroticism". He credited Simone de Beauvoir with anticipating Foucault's view that patterns of sexual desire and behavior are socially determined.

Evaluations in books, 1976–1989
The historian Jane Caplan called The History of Sexuality "certainly the most ambitious and interesting recent attempt to analyse the relations between the production of concepts and the history of society in the field of sexuality", but criticized Foucault for using an "undifferentiated concept" of speech and an imprecise notion of "power". The gay rights activist Dennis Altman described Foucault's work as representative of the position that homosexuals emerged as a social category in 18th and 19th century western Europe in The Homosexualization of America (1982). The feminist Germaine Greer wrote that Foucault rightly argues that, "what we have all along taken as the breaking-through of a silence and the long delayed giving of due attention to human sexuality was in fact the promotion of human sexuality, indeed, the creation of an internal focus for the individual's preoccupations." The historian Peter Gay wrote that Foucault is right to raise questions about the "repressive hypothesis", but that "his procedure is anecdotal and almost wholly unencumbered by facts; using his accustomed technique (reminiscent of the principle underlying Oscar Wilde's humor) of turning accepted ideas upside down, he turns out to be right in part for his private reasons." The philosopher José Guilherme Merquior suggested in Foucault (1985) that Foucault's views about sexual repression are preferable to those of Reich, Herbert Marcuse, and their followers in that they have provide more accurate descriptions and that Foucault is supported by "the latest historiographic research on bourgeois sex". Merquior considered the second two volumes of The History of Sexuality to be of higher scholarly quality than the first, and found Foucault to be "original and insightful" in his discussion of the Roman Emperor Marcus Aurelius and other Stoics in The Care of the Self. However, he found the details of Foucault's views open to question, and suggested that Foucault's discussion of Greek pederasty is less illuminating than that of Kenneth Dover, despite Foucault's references to Dover's Greek Homosexuality (1978).

The philosopher Roger Scruton rejected Foucault's claim that sexual morality is culturally relative in Sexual Desire (1986). He also criticized Foucault for assuming that there could be societies in which a "problematisation" of the sexual did not occur. Scruton concluded that, "No history of thought could show the 'problematisation' of sexual experience to be peculiar to certain specific social formations: it is characteristic of personal experience generally, and therefore of every genuine social order." The philosopher Peter Dews argued in Logics of Disintegration that Foucault's rejection of the repressive hypothesis is more apparent than real, and that the hypothesis is not "abolished, but simply displaced" in The History of Sexuality, as shown for example by Foucault's persistent references to "the body and its pleasures" and to ars erotica. The classicist Page duBois called The Use of Pleasure "one of the most exciting new books" in classical studies and "an important contribution to the history of sexuality", but added that Foucault "takes for granted, and thus 'authorizes,' exactly what needs to be explained: the philosophical establishment of the autonomous male subject". The historian Patricia O'Brien wrote that Foucault was "without expertise" in dealing with antiquity, and that The History of Sexuality lacks the "methodological rigor" of Foucault's earlier works, especially Discipline and Punish.

Evaluations in books, 1990–present
The philosopher Judith Butler argued in Gender Trouble (1990) that the theory of power Foucault expounds in the first volume of The History of Sexuality is to some extent contradicted by Foucault's subsequent discussion of the journals of Herculine Barbin, a 19th-century French intersex person: whereas in the former work Foucault asserts that sexuality is coextensive with power, in Herculine Barbin he "fails to recognize the concrete relations of power that both construct and condemn Herculine's sexuality", instead romanticizing Barbin's world of pleasure as the "happy limbo of a non-identity", and expressing views akin to those of Marcuse. Butler further argued that this conflict is evident within The History of Sexuality, noting that Foucault refers there to "bucolic" and "innocent" sexual pleasures that exist prior to the imposition of "regulative strategies".

The classicist David M. Halperin claimed in One Hundred Years of Homosexuality (1990) that the appearance of the English translation of the first volume of Foucault's work in 1978, together with the publication of Dover's Greek Homosexuality the same year, marked the beginning of a new era in the study of the history of sexuality. He suggested that The History of Sexuality may be the most important contribution to the history of western morality since Friedrich Nietzsche's On the Genealogy of Morality (1887). The critic Camille Paglia rejected Halperin's views, calling The History of Sexuality a "disaster". Paglia wrote that much of The History of Sexuality is fantasy unsupported by the historical record, and that it "is acknowledged even by Foucault's admirers to be his weakest work". The economist Richard Posner described The History of Sexuality as, "a remarkable fusion of philosophy and intellectual history" in Sex and Reason (1992), adding that the book is lucidly written.

Diana Hamer wrote in the anthology The Sexual Imagination From Acker to Zola (1993) that The History of Sexuality is Foucault's best-known work on sexuality. The historian Michael Mason wrote that in The History of Sexuality, Foucault presents what amounts to an argument "against the possibility of making historical connections between beliefs about sex and sexual practices", but that the argument is only acceptable if one accepts the need to shift attention from "sexuality" to "sex" in thinking about the sexual culture of the last three centuries, and that Foucault does not make a case for such a need. The critic Alexander Welsh criticized Foucault for failing to place Sigmund Freud in the context of 19th century thought and culture. The classicist Walter Burkert called Foucault's work the leading example of the position that sexuality takes different forms in different civilizations and is therefore a cultural construct. The historian Roy Porter called The History of Sexuality, "a brilliant enterprise, astonishingly bold, shocking even, in its subversion of conventional explanatory frameworks, chronologies, and evaluations, and in its proposed alternatives." Porter credited Foucault with discrediting the view, proposed for example by Marcuse in Eros and Civilization (1955), that "industrialization demanded erotic austerity." The philosopher Martha Nussbaum wrote that the claim that homosexuality is a cultural construction is associated more with Foucault's The History of Sexuality than with any other work.

The classicist Bruce Thornton wrote that The Use of Pleasure was, "usually quite readable, surveying the ancient evidence to make some good observations about the various techniques developed to control passion", but faulted Foucault for limiting his scope to "fourth-century medical and philosophical works". The philosopher Arnold Davidson wrote that while "Foucault's interpretation of the culture of the self in late antiquity is sometimes too narrow and therefore misleading", this is a defect of "interpretation" rather than of "conceptualization." Davidson argued that, "Foucault's conceptualization of ethics as the self's relationship to itself provides us with a framework of enormous depth and subtlety" and "allows us to grasp aspects of ancient thought that would otherwise remain occluded."

The psychoanalyst Joel Whitebook argued that while Foucault proposes that "bodies and pleasures" should be the rallying point against "the deployment of sexuality", "bodies and pleasures", like other Foucauldian terms, is a notion with "little content." Whitebook, who endorsed Dews' assessment of Foucault's work, found Foucault's views to be comparable to those of Marcuse and suggested that Foucault was indebted to Marcuse. In 2005, Scruton dismissed The History of Sexuality as "mendacious", and called his book Sexual Desire (1986) an answer to Foucault's work. Romana Byrne criticized Foucault's argument that the scientia sexualis belongs to modern Western culture while the ars erotica belongs only to Eastern and Ancient societies, arguing that a form of ars erotica has been evident in Western society since at least the eighteenth century.

Scruton wrote in 2015 that, contrary to Foucault's claims, the ancient texts Foucault examines in The Use of Pleasure are not primarily about sexual pleasure. Nevertheless, he found the second two volumes of The History of Sexuality more scholarly than Foucault's previous work. Scruton concluded, of the work in general, that it creates an impression of a "normalized" Foucault: "His command of the French language, his fascination with ancient texts and the by-ways of history, his flamboyant imagination and beautiful style - all have been put, at last, to a proper use, in order to describe the human condition respectfully, and to cease to look for the secret 'structures' beneath its smile."

See also
 Foucauldian discourse analysis
 Greek love
 Postsexualism

References

Bibliography
Books

 
 
 
 
 
 
 
 
 
 
 
 
 
 
 
 
 
 
 
 
 
 
 
 
 
 
 
 
 
 
 
 
 
 
 
 

Journals

External links
 Summaries of the book:  
 Previews of the original French editions: La volonté de savoir, La volonté de savoir (Google Books)

1976 non-fiction books
1984 non-fiction books
Books about social history
Books about the philosophy of sexuality
Éditions Gallimard books
French non-fiction books
Works by Michel Foucault
Augustine studies